Kevin Pollock (born February 7, 1970) is a Canadian ice hockey official. He has worked in the National Hockey League since the 1999–2000 NHL season, and officiated in ice hockey at the 2014 Winter Olympics – Men's tournament.

Career
Kevin Pollock was born on February 7, 1970, in Kincardine, Ontario, and has been a National Hockey League referee since the 1999–2000 NHL season, and wears uniform number 33. 

He was selected to work games in the ice hockey men's tournament at the 2014 Winter Olympics in Sochi, Russia, and in the 2015 Stanley Cup Finals. He refereed game 6 of the 2017 Stanley Cup Finals, with the Pittsburgh Penguins winning the game and ultimately the Stanley Cup.

As a junior ice hockey player, Pollock won an Ontario Hockey Association (OHA) championship with the Hanover Barons in 1991. He later officiated in the OHA before working in the NHL. His granduncle Lloyd Pollock was a founder of the original Windsor Spitfires junior team, and later served as president of the OHA and the Canadian Amateur Hockey Association. Kevin and his father Clarke Pollock, are the namesakes of the Pollock Division in the Provincial Junior Hockey League.

References

1970 births
Living people
Canadian ice hockey officials
Ice hockey people from Ontario
National Hockey League officials
Ontario Hockey Association players
People from Bruce County